The Pahang River is a river that flows through the state of Pahang, Malaysia. At 459 km in length, it is the longest river on the Malay Peninsula. The river begins at the confluence of Jelai and Tembeling rivers on the Titiwangsa Mountains and drains into the South China Sea.

River course 

From the upper slopes of the Titiwangsa Mountains at Cameron Highlands, the Jelai River flows in a southeasterly direction, passing through Padang Tengku and Kuala Lipis before merging with the Tembeling River. The Tembeling River, which begins at Pahang and the Terengganu state border at Ulu Tembeling, flows in a southwesterly direction passing through Kuala Tahan. The Pahang River flows in a southerly direction passing through Jerantut Feri, Kuala Krau, Kerdau and Temerloh. At Mengkarak, the river turns to the northeast, passing through Chenor and then turning east at Lubuk Paku and Lepar into the floodplain of Paloh Hinai, Pekan and Kuala Pahang before draining into the South China Sea.

From the source to the mouth, the Pahang River basin comprises almost all the districts in Pahang, including Cameron Highlands, Lipis, Jerantut, Temerloh, Bera, Maran and Pekan. The Lipis River, a tributary of the Jelai River, begins at the Pahang and Perak state border in Ulu Sungai, Raub district and ends at the confluence of Jelai River and Lipis River at Kuala Lipis. Semantan River, a tributary of the Pahang River begins in Bentong district and ends at the confluence of the Pahang River and Semantan River at Kuala Semantan. The Triang River and Bera River, tributaries of the Pahang River, begin at the Jelebu and Jempol districts of Negeri Sembilan state while the Lepar River, another tributary of the Pahang River, passing through Kuantan district in the east before ending at the confluence of the Pahang River and Lepar River at Paloh Hinai.

The only district in Pahang that does not have a tributary of the Pahang River or have the Pahang River flowing through it is Rompin.

History 

The banks of the Pahang River were settled as early as 1400 by warriors and seafarers from around Maritime Southeast Asia including places such as Aceh, Riau, Palembang and Sulawesi. The earliest historical records of the Pahang River, the riverine inhabitants or the people of Pahang were found in the Malay Annals and Hikayat Abdullah.

Early transportation role 

The Pahang and Muar Rivers were nearly connected at a place called Jempol, in Negeri Sembilan as the Serting River flows into the Bera River, a tributary of the Pahang River. The Jempol River flows into the Muar River. Trading boats from the Muar could continue their journey until they reached Kuala Pahang in Pekan, or Kuala Lipis to continue into Terengganu, Kelantan or Perak.

Natural history 

During the Pleistocene epoch or Mesolithic period about 10,000 years ago, there was a 5 degrees celsius drop in the global temperature. At mountaintops, snow accumulated as ice caps and glaciers (including Mount Kinabalu), thus disrupting the global hydrological cycle. Due to lack of water discharge into the sea, the sea level was 120 meters lower than it is today. The South China Sea dried up, exposing the Sunda Shelf and previous deep trenches became huge ancient rivers called the North Sunda River.

Mainland Asia, the Malay Peninsula, Sumatra and Java became connected to Borneo via the landbridge of exposed Sunda Shelf. The North Sunda River provided vital connection to the Mekong River in Vietnam and the Chao Phraya River in Thailand to the north, the Baram and Rajang rivers in Sarawak to the east and the Pahang River and Rompin River to the west of the massive land mass. Freshwater catfishes from those rivers migrated and mated to exchange their genetic materials about 10,000 years ago. Thus, after the Holocene, when the temperature increased, a substantial amount of the ice that had accumulated melted, increasing sea levels, inundating the landbridges and the Sunda River, thus isolating the catfish populations. However, their genetic motives are still in the DNA as an evidence of the previous connections of the Pahang River to other isolated rivers in Indochina and Borneo.

Towns and Bridges 

Jerantut is 15 km from the confluence of the Jelai River and the Tembeling River. Temerloh is situated on the confluence between the Semantan River and Pahang River. The town of Pekan, which is Pahang's royal town, is situated on the southern bank of the river, near the river mouth.

There are seven bridges built across the river. The bridges are the Abu Bakar Bridge in Pekan, the Paloh Hinai bridge of Tun Razak Highway in Paloh Hinai, the Chenor Bridge in Chenor, the new Temerloh Bridge in Temerloh, the Semantan Bridge of East Coast Expressway in Sanggang, the Sultan Ahmad Shah Bridge in Kuala Krau and the Sultan Abdullah Bridge in Jerantut Feri.

Bera is the only district on the Pahang River watershed that has no bridge crossing the river.

Gallery

References on Historical Pahang 

 Sejarah Melayu. 1612-1615. Tun Seri Lanang.
 Yusoff Iskandar, Abdul Rahman Kaeh;  W G Shellabear. Sejarah Melayu : satu pembicaraan kritis dari pelbagai bidang.
 Abdullah, W. G. (William Girdlestone) Shellabear. Hikayat Munshi Abdullah bin Abdul Kadir
 Anon. The Hikayat Abdullah.
 A. C Milner. A Missionary : Source for a Biography of Munshi Abdullah.
 Anthony Milner. The Invention of Politics in Colonial Malaya.
 C. M. (Constance Mary) Turnbull The Straits Settlements, 1826-67: Indian Presidency to Crown Colony.
 Journal of the Malayan Branch of the Royal Asiatic Society.
 Journal of the Federated Malay States Museums
 The Selangor Journal: Jottings Past and Present.
 S. L. Wong Exciting Malaysia: A Visual Journey.
 Carl A. Trocki. 1999. Opium, Empire and the Global Political Economy: Asia's Transformations.
 Virginia Matheson Hooker. A Short History of Malaysia: Linking East and West.
 Nicholas Tarling.  The Cambridge History of Southeast Asia.
 S. Durai Raja Singam. 1980. Place-names in Peninsular Malaysia.
 Muhammad Haji Salleh. Sajak-Sajak Sejarah Melayu.
 Lucian Boia. Great Historians from Antiquity to 1800: An International Dictionary.
 MacKinnon K, Hatta G, Halim H, Mangalik A.1998. The ecology of Kalimantan. Oxford University Press, London.

See also 
 Malaysia
 Pahang
 Prehistoric Malaysia
 Pekan District
 Muar River
 Taman Negara National Park
 Malay Peninsula
 Titiwangsa Mountains

External links
 Up close with Sungai Pahang.
 Mat Kilau, the Malay warrior.
 Unexplored Corner of Pahang. Journal of the Straits Branch of the Royal Asiatic Society.
 Bridges over Sungai Pahang.
 New Species from Sungai Pahang.
 Fish of Sungai Akah.
 Sungei Jeli.
 Pahang ICT.
 "sungei Palaeoecology of Pahang.
 TC Whitmore reference on Pahang.
 Pahang Experts.
 Pahang Overview.
 Pahang peatswamp.
 Pahang interest.
 Melioidosis in Pahang.
 Caves in Pahang.
 Forest Collectors.
 Human Development.

History of Pahang
Rivers of Pahang
Rivers of Malaysia